Zager and Evans were an American rock-pop duo active during the late 1960s and early 1970s, comprising Denny Zager (born February 14, 1944, Wymore, Nebraska) and Rick Evans (born January 20, 1943, Lincoln, Nebraska, died February 2018, Santa Fe, New Mexico). They are best known for their 1969 No. 1 hit single "In the Year 2525", which earned them one-hit wonder status.

History
Denny Zager and Rick Evans met at Nebraska Wesleyan University in 1962. They were joined by drummer Danny Schindler (later of the Benders) in the Nebraska band the Eccentrics until Schindler's tour of Vietnam in 1965. Evans also left in 1965 and reunited with Zager in 1968.

As Zager and Evans, the duo were backed by another Nebraska native, Mark Dalton, on bass. Their first drummer, Paul Maher, was later replaced by another Nebraskan, Dave Trupp. Trupp and Dalton were also the rhythm section in the Liberation Blues Band and backed Evans on some solo demo material prior to Zager and Evans's recording of "In the Year 2525" in 1968.

"In the Year 2525"

Written by Evans, "In the Year 2525 (Exordium & Terminus)" warned of the dangers of technology, portraying a future in which the human race was destroyed by its own technological and medical innovations. The last stanzas of the song suggest mankind undergoes a continuing cycle of birth, death, and rebirth.

"In the Year 2525" hit number one on the Billboard Hot 100 in 1969, ultimately claiming the top spot for six weeks. It also hit #1 in the UK. The song topped the charts at the time of two major cultural events: the first moon landing on July 20, 1969 and the Woodstock Music Festival a month later. The record sold over four million copies by 1970 and was awarded a gold disc by the Recording Industry Association of America (RIAA) in July 1969.

"2525" was originally written in 1964, but not recorded or released until 1968 on the Truth Records label. After radio stations in Lincoln and Omaha made "2525" a regional "break-out" hit record, RCA Records signed the duo and released the song with "Little Kids", also written by Evans, as the B-side nationwide. Zager and Evans also immediately recorded an album of the same name, again using Trupp and Dalton as the primary rhythm section. "In the Year 2525" remains popular on oldies stations; sales of the original hit recording, including singles sales, album usage and compilation inclusions, are estimated at over ten million worldwide. In Italy, the duo released an Italian version on RCA Victor 1583: "Nell'anno 2033" b/w "Donna" ("Woman").

Later recordings
Zager and Evans are considered to be the archetypal one-hit wonder artists.  Despite the success of "2525" (it was even nominated for a special Hugo Award), the follow-up single, "Mr. Turnkey", failed to chart in the US and UK, as did subsequent releases.  As of 2019, the duo remains the only act to have a chart-topping hit on both sides of the Atlantic and never have another chart single in Billboard or the UK.  Their third single, "Listen to the People", appeared on the Cashbox chart at #100, while "Mr. Turnkey"/"Cary Lynn Javes" (double A-side) and "Help One Man Today" both charted in Australia, at #86 and #94 respectively.

After the success of "2525", White Whale Records released an LP titled The Early Writings of Zager & Evans and Others featuring recordings of the Eccentrics on side one and a band called J.K. and Co., who had no connection to Zager and Evans, on side two. After releasing two albums on RCA, Zager and Evans moved to Vanguard Records in 1971 for a final record, titled Food for the Mind.

Evans later released an album for Truth Records titled I Need This Song, a duet with Pam Herbert.  In the late 1970s, he formed his own label, Fun Records, and released an album titled Fun Songs, Think Songs containing both new material and re-recordings of Zager and Evans material.

Today
Zager now builds custom guitars at Zager Guitars in Lincoln, Nebraska. 

Evans largely retired from public life but he continued to chat online with Dalton and his best friend, Nashville producer Gary Earl, until his death in February 2018. 
 
Drummer Dave Trupp died in November 2015 at the age of 72. 

Mark Dalton still performs on bass in the Pacific Northwest of the United States.

Discography

Albums

Singles

References

External links
 
 
 
 Biographical info on Mark Dalton

Rock music groups from Nebraska
American musical duos
RCA Records artists